Peter Thomas Walsh is an American singer, songwriter, and record producer. Based in Los Angeles, California, he has worked with a range of popular artists, including Selena Gomez, Pink, and Sheppard. He is also known as the main collaborator of the singer-songwriter, Betty Who. He has written and produced hit songs including "Walk Me Home" by Pink, "Sparks" by Hilary Duff, and "Somebody Loves You" by Betty Who. In 2018, he launched his career as a singer, releasing Carly Rae Jepsen cover, "Run Away with Me" with his fellow singer-songwriter Leland.

Personal life 
Thomas is currently based in Los Angeles, California. He is openly gay.

Discography

As lead artist

Studio albums

Extended plays

Singles

Music videos

Songwriting and production credits
 indicates a song that was released as a single.

Awards and nominations

Notes

References 

Living people
20th-century American singers
21st-century American singers
American male singer-songwriters
American gay writers
American LGBT singers
20th-century American male singers
21st-century American male singers
Year of birth missing (living people)
American singer-songwriters